Blue Rabbit is an album by American jazz saxophonist Johnny Hodges and organist Wild Bill Davis featuring performances recorded in 1963 and 1964 and released on the Verve label.

Reception

The Allmusic site awarded the album 3 stars stating "The music is fairly typical for a Hodges date, with four Ellington standards, some blues and some basic originals. In a few spots, the organists really do a good job of filling in for the Ellington Orchestra. Tasty and swinging music".

Track listing
 "Blues O' Mighty" (Johnny Hodges, Edith Hodges) - 4:54
 "Fiddler's Fancy" (Wild Bill Davis) - 2:50
 "Tangerine" (Victor Schertzinger, Johnny Mercer) - 3:17
 "Creole Love Call" (Duke Ellington) - 5:45
 "Things Ain't What They Used To Be" (Mercer Ellington, Ted Parsons) - 4:15
 "Wisteria" (Mercer Ellington, Jimmy Jones) - 3:10
 "Satin Doll" (Billy Strayhorn, Duke Ellington) - 2:28
 "I Let a Song Go Out of My Heart" (Duke Ellington, Irving Mills, Henry Nemo, John Redmond) - 2:37
 "Mud Pie" (Jimmy Hamilton) - 4:10
Recorded in New York on May 15, 1963 (tracks 3 & 8), May 16, 1963 (track 4), April 28, 1964 (tracks 1, 2, 5 & 7), and April 30, 1964 (tracks 6 & 9)

Personnel
Johnny Hodges - alto saxophone
Wild Bill Davis (tracks 1, 2, 5-7 & 9), Ray Jackson (tracks 3, 4 & 8) - organ
Kenny Burrell (tracks 3, 4 & 8), Mundell Lowe (tracks 1, 2, 5-7 & 9) - guitar
Richard Davis (tracks 1, 2, 5-7 & 9), Jack Lesberg (track 4), Wendell Marshall (tracks 3 & 8) - double bass
Bobby Donaldson (tracks 3, 4 & 8), Osie Johnson (tracks 1, 2, 5-7 & 9) - drums

References

Johnny Hodges albums
Wild Bill Davis albums
1964 albums
Albums produced by Creed Taylor
Verve Records albums